A huaya ("Flower Print"; ;) is a stylized signature or mark used in East Asian cultures in place of a true signature. Originating from China, the huaya was historically used by prominent figures such as government officials, artists, and craftsmen. In modern times, they are still occasionally used by important people. Most huaya are constructed from parts of Chinese characters and resemble them to a certain degree, depending on the calligraphy style.

History

China
The oldest surviving record of huaya is in the Book of Northern Qi, the official history of the Northern Qi dynasty (550–577 AD). Huaya reached its peak popularity during the Northern Song dynasty (960-1127). After that, its popularity began to decline.

Japan
Huaya first spread to Japan during the Heian period (794-1185), where it is called kaō. Though their use became far less widespread after the Edo period, they continue to be used even by some contemporary politicians and other famous people. The reading and identification of individual kaō often requires specialist knowledge; whole books devoted to the topic have been published.

See also
Tughra, stylised Arabic signatures used by Ottoman sultans
Khelrtva, stylised Georgian calligraphic signatures
Signature

References

Japanese culture
Japanese calligraphy
Authentication methods
Identity documents
Signature